Victor Magtanggol (International title: Heart of Courage) is a 2018 Philippine television drama action fantasy series broadcast by GMA Network. The series is inspired by Norse mythology. Directed by Dominic Zapata, it stars Alden Richards in the title role. It premiered on July 30, 2018, on the network's Telebabad line up, replacing The Cure. The series concluded on November 16, 2018, with a total of 80 episodes. It was replaced by Cain at Abel in its timeslot.

The series is originally titled as Mitho. It is streaming online on YouTube.

Premise
Many gods, including Thor, will not survive the Ragnarök. Before Thor's death, he orders his son Magni to hide his weapon, the hammer Mjölnir, until there is someone right to inherit it. Magni goes to the world of mortals to wait for the new taker of Mjölnir. There he meets Victor Magtanggol, the one who must eventually learn to use Mjölnir to protect the world and his loved ones from Móði, Thor's son and Magni's brother, who is upset for not inheriting Mjölnir, and Loki who plans to spread chaos in the mortal world.

Cast and characters

Lead cast
 Alden Richards as Victor "Hammerman" Magtanggol

Supporting cast
 Coney Reyes as Vivienne Delos Santos-Magtanggol
 Eric Quizon as Hector Regalado
 Andrea Torres as Sif / Ms. S
 Janine Gutierrez as Gwen Regalado-Corona
 Pancho Magno as Móði
 John Estrada as Loki / Mikolai
 Al Tantay as Tomas Magtanggol
 Freddie Webb as Renato Regalado
 Chynna Ortaleza as Lynette Magtanggol-Domingo / Hel
 Maritoni Fernandez as Alice Espiritu-Regalado
 Dion Ignacio as Percival "Perci" Domingo
 Kristofer Martin as Lance E. Regalado / Fenrir
 Miguel Faustmann as Magni / Magnus
 Yuan Francisco as Carmelo "Meloy" M. Domingo
 Lindsay De Vera as Anne Magtanggol
 Reese Tuazon as Honelyn De Mesa
 Benjie Paras as Erwin Bravo
 Lucho Ayala as Timothy Ferdinand "Tim" Corona
 Jon Gutierrez as Mario Magtanggol
 Flow-G as Luigi Magtanggol

Recurring cast
 Noel Urbano as the voice of Níðhöggr and Ratatoskr

Guest cast
 Conan Stevens as Thor
 Matthias Rhoads as James
 Diana Zubiri as Freya
 Fabio Ide as Baldur
 Natalia Moon as Frigg
 Sheena Halili as Janice
Luri Vincent Nalus as Dennis
 Michelle Dee as Gwen's boss
 Chariz Solomon as Cynthia
 John Feir as a construction worker
 Pekto as Ringgo
 Rob Moya as a construction worker
 Kevin Santos as James
 Carlos Agassi as Arvin
 Sophie Albert as Edda
 Pen Medina as Alcala
 Glaiza de Castro as Ena
 Kylie Padilla as Ami
 Gabbi Garcia as Lena
 Sanya Lopez as Aya
 Janice Hung as Gunnlöð
 Ian Ignacio as Þrymr
 Tonio Quiazon as a gun smuggler
 Dave Bornea as Iking
 Julius Miguel as teen Meloy

Production
GMA Network tasked writers to come up for a television series based on Norse mythology. Jules Katanyag, concept creator of Victor Magtanggol described what he and other writers came up as "best reflects the Filipino condition," which is that of uncertainty.

The show is set in present-day Philippines, after several Norse deities including Thor died following Ragnarök, a series of catastrophic events in the Norse Mythology. Part of the series was also shot outside of the Philippines.

The theme song "Superhero Mo," is a collaboration between Alden Richards and the hip-hop group Ex Battalion. The latter composed the song. A lyric video for the song was released by GMA Music on May 28, 2018.

Accolades

References

External links
 
 

2018 Philippine television series debuts
2018 Philippine television series endings
Fantaserye and telefantasya
Filipino-language television shows
GMA Network drama series
Philippine action television series
Superhero television shows
Television series based on Norse mythology
Television shows set in the Philippines